The Ba Son Bridge (Vietnamese: Cầu Ba Son), originally known as Thu Thiem 2 Bridge, is a 6-lane bridge in Ho Chi Minh City, Vietnam, opened in 2022. The bridge crosses the Saigon River to link District 1 and Thu Duc City.

The bridge was named after the Ba Son Shipyard, whose site is nearby.

References 

Road bridges in Vietnam
Transport in Ho Chi Minh City
Buildings and structures in Ho Chi Minh City
Bridges completed in 2022

Bridges over the Saigon River